Nicholas Murphy is a Gaelic football player.

Nicholas or Nick Murphy may also refer to:

Nicholas Daniel Murphy (1811–1890), Irish politician
Nicholas Joseph Murphy (1880–1913), Irish nationalist politician
Nicholas Murphy, founding pastor of Our Lady of Good Counsel's Church (Staten Island, New York)
Nick Murphy (American football) (born 1979), American football player
Nick Murphy (footballer, born 1946) (born 1946), English footballer
Nick Murphy (footballer, born 1966) (1966–1998), English footballer
Nick Murphy (director), British film director and television director
Nick Vincent Murphy (born 1977), Irish writer
Chet Faker (born Nicholas James Murphy, 1988), Australian musician also known as Nick Murphy